Gramella is a genus of bacteria from the family of Flavobacteriaceae. Gramella is named after the Danish pharmacologist Hans Christian Gram.

References

Flavobacteria
Bacteria genera
Taxa described in 2005